Conotalopia henniana is a species of very small sea snail, a marine gastropod mollusk in the family Trochidae, the top snails.

Description
The height of the shell attains 3.25 mm, its diameter 4.5 mm. The red-brown shell has a depressed-conical shape and is profoundly umbilicated. The five whorls show a microscopic sculpture of fine radial threads that overrun the spirals and are more apparent on the base. In colour it is variable, the figured example has walnut-brown radial flames on a grey ground, in others the flames are brick red and in some the flames break up into small chequers.

Distribution
This marine species is endemic to Australia and occurs on sandy beaches off Queensland.

References

 Melvill, J.C. 1891. Descriptions of eleven new species belonging to the genera Columbrarium, Pisania, Minolia, Liotia, and Solarium. Journal of Conchology 6(12): 405-411
 Hedley, C. 1912. Descriptions of some new or noteworthy shells in the Australian Museum. Records of the Australian Museum 8: 131-160 [137, pl. 41, figs. 13-15] 
 Wilson, B. 1993. Australian Marine Shells. Prosobranch Gastropods. Kallaroo, Western Australia : Odyssey Publishing Vol. 1 408 pp.

External links
 To World Register of Marine Species

henniana
Gastropods of Australia
Gastropods described in 1967